John Keister (born 11 November 1970) is a football coach and former professional player. Born in England, he represented the Sierra Leone national team during his career and currently serves as its head coach.

Keister started his career at Sierra Leone side Tigres in 1992 before moving to England in 1993. Since living in England he has played for  Walsall, Chester City, Shrewsbury Town, Stevenage Borough, Margate and Dover Athletic where he was captain before returning to previous club Margate on a free transfer in September 2009.

Whilst playing for non-league club Margate he gained two international caps for Sierra Leone. He played in two World Cup qualifying games against Nigeria and Morocco, making him the first player from the club to receive international recognition whilst playing for them.

Keister was player-assistant manager at the club but left in February 2011.

Following a spell at FC Johansen, he was appointed as manager of the Sierra Leone national team in 2017.  After leaving the post in 2019, he was reappointed in August 2020.

References

External links

 John Keister Interview

1970 births
Living people
English sportspeople of Sierra Leonean descent
People with acquired Sierra Leonean citizenship
Footballers from Manchester
Sierra Leonean footballers
Sierra Leonean football managers
Association football midfielders
Margate F.C. players
Walsall F.C. players
Shrewsbury Town F.C. players
Chester City F.C. players
Stevenage F.C. players
Dover Athletic F.C. players
English Football League players
National League (English football) players
English footballers
Sierra Leone international footballers
Black British sportspeople
English expatriate football managers
English expatriate footballers
English football managers
British expatriate sportspeople in Sierra Leone
Sierra Leone national football team managers